{{DISPLAYTITLE:C17H26O3}}

The molecular formula C17H26O3 (molar mass :278.39 g/mol) may refer to :
 Panaxytriol, a fatty alcohol found in ginseng
 Paradol, the active flavor constituent of the seeds of Guinea pepper